Chu Hui (born 21 February 1969) is a Chinese basketball player. She competed in the women's tournament at the 1996 Summer Olympics.

References

1969 births
Living people
Chinese women's basketball players
Olympic basketball players of China
Basketball players at the 1996 Summer Olympics
Basketball players from Liaoning